Hugo Beltrami is a Canadian natural scientist, currently a Canada Research Chair in Climate Dynamics at St. Francis Xavier University. He works as a professor in the Climate & Atmospheric Sciences Institute at St. Francis Xavier University

References

Year of birth missing (living people)
Living people
Academic staff of St. Francis Xavier University
Canadian engineers
Université du Québec à Montréal alumni
Queen's University at Kingston alumni
University of Winnipeg alumni